"Love Me Again" is a song by British singer-songwriter Raye, released as the lead single from her debut mini-album, Euphoric Sad Songs on 2 August 2019. The song was written by Janée Bennett and Raye, and produced by Fred Ball. A remix with British singer-songwriter Jess Glynne was released on 30 August 2019.

Track listing

Charts

Release history

References

2019 singles
2019 songs
Polydor Records singles
Raye (singer) songs
Songs written by Raye (singer)
Songs written by Jin Jin (musician)
Jess Glynne songs